Trond Andersen (born 6 January 1975) is a former Norwegian footballer, who played as a central defender or holding midfielder. He played professional for Molde, Wimbledon, AaB and Brøndby.

Club career
Andersen was born in Kristiansund and played for Clausenengen before he joined Molde ahead of the 1995 season. He played for the Tippeligaen side until the summer of 1999, when he was sold to Wimbledon, right before Molde's Champions League matches against Mallorca. Molde's head coach Erik Brakstad stated in 2011 that if the club had not sold their best player (Andersen), Molde could have advanced from the group stage of 1999–2000 UEFA Champions League.

After playing for Wimbledon for four seasons, Andersen moved to Denmark to play for Aalborg in the Danish Superliga in 2003, before being bought by rivals Brøndby in September 2005. In April 2006, he suffered a knee injury. As he had not recovered by March 2007, Andersen considered retiring from the game.

International career
Andersen played 38 matches for the Norway national football team. He was in roster for Euro 2000. His last international match was an April 2005 friendly match against Estonia.

Career statistics

Coaching
In 2015, he took over as head coach of Lyn Fotball, after one season as junior coach.

Honours
Individual
 Verdens Gang Norwegian Premier League Player of the Year 1999

References

External links
 Brøndby IF profile
 Aalborg BK profile
 Career stats by Danmarks Radio
 
 Official Site

1975 births
Living people
Sportspeople from Kristiansund
Norwegian footballers
Norway international footballers
Norway youth international footballers
Norway under-21 international footballers
Association football defenders
Clausenengen FK players
Molde FK players
Wimbledon F.C. players
AaB Fodbold players
Brøndby IF players
Eliteserien players
Premier League players
English Football League players
Danish Superliga players
UEFA Euro 2000 players
Norwegian expatriate footballers
Expatriate men's footballers in Denmark
Norwegian expatriate sportspeople in Denmark
Expatriate footballers in England
Norwegian expatriate sportspeople in England
Norwegian football managers